The  was a feudal domain in Hida Province, Japan. It was also called the Takayama Domain (高山藩 Takayama-han). The area was controlled by the Kanamori clan.

Leaders
The Kanamori clan ruled the domain from 1586 to 1692, when the domain came under control of the new national government.

Kanamori clan
Kanamori Nagachika
Kanamori Yoshishige (金森可重)
Kanamori Shigeyori (金森重頼)
Kanamori Yorinao (金森頼直)
Kanamori Yorinari (金森頼業)
Kanamori Yoritoki (金森頼時)

See also
Han system
List of Han

References

Domains of Japan